The Convair XGAM-71 Buck Duck was an air-launched decoy missile that was developed by Convair in the early 1950s.  It was intended to have the same radar signature as the Strategic Air Command's B-36 bomber, thereby allowing it to disrupt the enemy's air defenses and dilute their effort to shoot down an incoming bomber fleet.

Convair built the first prototype using its own funds, but the company received an official development contract from the United States Air Force on 16 August 1954.  The USAF's Materiel Command project designation for the program was MX-2224.  When the Air Force decided to put the project into production, it received the designation GAM-71.

As initially envisioned by the Air Force, one B-36 in the-then typical three-plane attack formation would be filled with up to seven GAM-71s apportioned within its three bomb bays.  A mixture of Ducks and other weapons was also possible, although the Air Force did not specify that it intended to use mixed loads.

To fit in the bomb bay of a B-36, the GAM-71 was relatively small; its wings were folded when it was stowed in the bay.  To mimic the radar cross-section of the B-36, it carried internal radar reflectors.

In February 1955, unpowered glide tests of XGAM-71 prototypes began using a modified B-29 Superfortress as the mothership.  However, the program was delayed due to funding issues.  Convair also had higher priorities.  A total of seven flights were conducted before the program was cancelled in January 1956, an event that researcher Dennis Jenkins attributes to the B-36's anticipated phase-out by decade's end.

Specifications

See also

References

GAM-071
1950s United States special-purpose aircraft
Decoy missiles of the United States
Unmanned military aircraft of the United States
Rocket-powered aircraft
High-wing aircraft
Abandoned military rocket and missile projects of the United States
Aircraft first flown in 1955